Peter McGuffin  (born 4 February 1949) is a psychiatrist and geneticist from Belfast, Northern Ireland.

Early life
Peter McGuffin was born in Belfast, Northern Ireland on 4 February 1949, the eldest of 3 children of Martha Melba  (née Burnison) and William Brown McGuffin, a merchant navy officer and Royal Naval reservist. The family moved to the Isle of Wight in 1959 on the appointment of William as a Trinity House Pilot for the Port of Southampton.

Education and career summary
McGuffin entered Sandown Grammar School, Isle of Wight aged 10 and made an early career choice age 15 that he wanted to become a psychiatrist after coming across Freud's Introductory Lectures on Psychoanalysis, in the local public library at Ryde. He attended medical school at the University of Leeds, where he graduated in 1972 and then received postgraduate training in internal medicine. It was at this stage that he became interested in genetics and had his first publications on immunogenetic aspects of coronary heart disease. He transferred this interest to psychiatric disorders and while he and his wife Anne Farmer were still junior doctors in Leeds, carried out one of the first genetic marker association studies on schizophrenia. This suggested an association between the HLA system and the disorder, something that was subsequently confirmed 36 years later by a genome wide association study led by one of McGuffin's former PhD students Michael C. O'Donovan

He completed his training as a psychiatrist at the Maudsley Hospital, London and was awarded a Medical Research Council Fellowship to study genetics at the University of London and at Washington University in St. Louis where he spent a formative 18 months under the mentorship of 'Ted' Theodore Reich and Irving I Gottesman. He completed a PhD with a thesis describing one of the first multi marker genetic linkage studies in schizophrenia. He subsequently became an MRC Senior Clinical Fellow at the Maudsley and the Institute of Psychiatry (now part of King's College London) and then took up the Chair of Psychological Medicine at the University of Wales College of Medicine in Cardiff in 1987. He subsequently established the Cardiff department as one of the World's leading centres for psychiatric genetic research and was among the early pioneers of multi-centre international collaborations in psychiatric genetics such as the European Science Foundation programme on the Molecular Neurobiology of Mental Illness.  He moved back to London as successor to Prof Sir Michael Rutter as Director of the MRC Social, Genetic and Developmental Psychiatry Centre at the Institute of Psychiatry in October 1998. From January 2007 to December 2009, he was the Dean of the Institute of Psychiatry. He was elected a founder Fellow of the Academy of Medical Sciences in 1998. Despite his very early Freudian leanings, McGuffin's research, his books and papers have been mainly on the genetics of normal and abnormal behaviour.

Research career and role in modern psychiatric genetics
By the late 1970s psychiatric genetics had almost disappeared in the United Kingdom as an active branch of science. The MRC were sufficiently concerned that they established an earmarked clinical training fellowship in the subject to which Peter McGuffin was appointed at the Institute of Psychiatry in 1979. He established links with labs elsewhere and gained training at the Royal London and UCL before spending 18 months at Washington University in St. Louis , one of the few centres in the world where psychiatric genetics was thriving. He returned to the UK in 1982 as one of the first appointees to the new MRC Senior Clinical Fellowship scheme and established a group within the genetic section of the Institute which was now beginning a renaissance under Robin Murray.  He proposed setting up a European collaboration which was funded by the ESF as the Molecular Neurobiology of Mental Illness programme (MNMI) and played a catalytic role in rejuvenating psychiatric genetics in Europe. With Tim Crow he organised the first two World Congresses of Psychiatric Genetics which then led to the formation of the International Society of Psychiatric Genetics. He succeeded Theodore Reich, the founding president, as the first of the society’s elected presidents. In 1987, aged 37, he took up the Chair of Psychological Medicine in Cardiff in a department that had little research profile and within a few years had built a group in psychiatric genetics that was seen as world leading and was awarded an MRC Clinical Research Initiative (CRI) Centre in 1992. In 1998 he became a founding fellow of the Academy of Medical Sciences, later serving on council, and in the same year was appointed, in succession to Michael Rutter, as Director of the MRC Social, Genetic and Developmental Psychiatry (SGDP) Centre, King’s College London. The SGDP expanded under his leadership achieving a major JIF award for a new building and successfully undergoing three quinquennial Centre grant renewals as one of the foremost departments of it kind in the world. 
Contributions to research:
 1.Linkage and association
As a junior doctor Peter McGuffin carried out one of the earliest allelic association studies in psychiatry. This implicated the major histocompatibility complex (MHC) in schizophrenia. He subsequently performed a meta-analysis of his and four other studies of HLA-schizophrenia association  showing highly significant results  . The MHC association was eventually confirmed by genome wide association studies (GWAS) more than 30 years later. He went on to perform the first family linkage study of schizophrenia that used multiple classical markers and applied plausible parametric models as well as non-parametric analysis [7]. This formed the basis of his PhD in which he also performed power analyses demonstrating that very much larger sample sizes would be necessary to identify responsible loci in disorders such as schizophrenia using linkage because of incomplete penetrance . To this end McGuffin, with his colleague Roger Marchbanks, wrote a proposal to the European Science Foundation (ESF) that led to the multi centre network, then programme, on MNMI .The MNMI ran from 1987–96 and brought together 14 ESF member organisations including the MRC. It kick started molecular psychiatric genetics in Europe and inspired the setting up of a parallel multicentre collaboration in the US under NIMH.
A solution to the problem of establishing diagnostic standardisation and reliability across the European and US collaborations was provided by the computerised OPCRIT system [11]. OPCRIT showed good reliability across European and US sites   and has continued to be used frequently in genetic and epidemiological studies including the bipolar disorder (BPD) component of the landmark 2007 Wellcome Trust Case Control study. 
Long before it was technically achievable, McGuffin was an advocate of aiming to scan the entire genome for genes involved in the common disorders such as schizophrenia, BPD and major depressive disorder (MDD), bearing in mind that they likely involved several, perhaps many, genes. This was also likely to be the case for quantitative behavioural traits such as cognitive ability. The principles were set out in an influential review with Plomin and Owen [12] which pointed out that linkage was appropriate for detection of quantitative trait loci (QTL) or polygenes contributing comparatively large amounts of variance (~10%) whereas association can detect small effects (1% or less). At this stage genome wide linkage was becoming feasible but GWAS was still a dream. The alternative association approach was a focus on candidate genes that encode for proteins with a plausible aetiological role. An example was the 5HT2a receptor gene found to be schizophrenia associated by EMASS (EU funded, PI McGuffin), the first multicentre candidate gene association study of its type [16].  
McGuffin subsequently led genome wide searches including the GSK funded Depression Network (DeNt) sib pair linkage study across 7 European and US sites [21] and the MRC funded first GWAS of MDD [23]. As with other disorders these initial genome wide searches pointed to the need for vastly larger sample sizes and so McGuffin’s group pooled resources with others forming the Psychiatric Genomics Consortium (PGC) which has gone onto to identify multiple genome wide significant ‘hits’ in BPD, MDD as well as in schizophrenia, autism and ADHD. By sharing genome wide data McGuffin’s group have also participated in successful searches in other disorders including MND and eye disease.
2. Gene -Environment (GE) Interplay
In 1982 McGuffin became the first psychiatrist to be awarded an MRC senior clinical fellowship. This was to carry out a novel family study of index cases with or without serious adversity in the form of threatening life events before the onset of MDD and their relatives. Contrary to the widely held clinical view at that time that depression could be divided into reactive and endogenous forms, there was no difference in the frequency of depression in relatives whether or not the index cases had an illness precipitated by adversity. Nor was there any correspondence between clinical symptom pattern and familiality.  Furthermore, the frequency of reported life events among relatives of index cases was markedly higher than that in the general population raising the issue that both adversity and depression were familial [10]. These findings were viewed as controversial at the time challenging the idea that it was possible to separate threatening events that arise “out of the blue” from those that are dependent on an individual’s behaviour. McGuffin followed up the Camberwell findings in a study in Cardiff that compared subjects with and without onset depression and their nearest age siblings. In a series of publications McGuffin and Farmer tested the alternative hypotheses that the familial overlap between depression and life events reflected either a hazard prone lifestyle or a tendency to over perceive adversity or simply a tendency for adverse events to be shared by relatives. The findings suggested that all three types of explanation played a part and the lifestyle or cognitive components were significantly influenced by personality factors [20]. This was in keeping with work by McGuffin and Thapar that self reported life events in adolescents have a heritable component whereas parent reported events in the same subjects do not. The genetic contribution to self reported events was subsequently confirmed by Robert Power one of McGuffin’s PhD students by estimating GWAS derived SNP-heritability .   
On a related theme, one of the most controversial areas in 21st century behavioural genetics has concerned attempts to explore GE interactions with specific brain expressed genes, much of the original work coming from other groups in the McGuffin led MRC SGDP Centre. Uher and McGuffin[22] have scrutinized the world data for a functional polymorphism in the promoter of the serotonin transporter (5HTT) gene and concluded that there is true effect, with positive replication depending on use of hard, objective environmental measurements. This is in keeping with McGuffin’s earlier findings that more subjective reports of adversity are influenced by personality/heritable factors. 
3. Twin studies
 McGuffin and colleagues re-examined the classic Maudsley schizophrenia study of Gottesman and Shields at a time when there widespread questioning of a genetic component for schizophrenia on the basis that studies until then had used descriptive clinical diagnoses rather than modern operational criteria. It was found that, far from reducing genetic evidence, the application of explicit and reliable modern criteria indicated high heritability (2). Subsequently the recently introduced DSM III criteria were scrutinized and found to be valid in that, when applied strictly and excluding broader phenotypes, they defined a highly heritable syndrome (3). Further studies using an extended Maudsley twin register series estimated heritability of related psychotic syndromes using structural equation models (SEM) (10) and also showed that the genetic components of schizophrenia and BPD overlap as well as having specific components distinct to each syndrome (12). This was thought highly controversial at the time but has now been borne out by other studies including GWAS. Turning to mood disorders it was shown with SEM that both clinically ascertained and operationally defined MDD (9) and BPD (13) are substantially heritable with both overlapping and syndrome-specific components. Again, this has now been confirmed by GWAS. 
Until the 1990s genetic data on childhood psychiatric disorders were scant.  With his then MRC fellow Anita Thapar, McGuffin launched a systematically ascertained Cardiff twin register. Among their early findings were that depressive symptomatology before adult life is influenced by genetic factors. More specifically, genetic effects were especially important in adolescence, whereas shared environmental effects account for most of the variation among children in the 8-11 age group [13], a pattern that has subsequently been replicated elsewhere. They were also among the first to establish heritability of ADHD and that severe ADHD with conduct problems is especially heritable being a more extreme form applying a multiple threshold model [17] 
4. Pharmacogenomics
 The EU funded GENDEP study is a multi-site investigation that used animal, in vitro and human studies to investigate predictors of antidepressant response. The first of its kind, the partly randomized human study of two drugs with differing modes of action (serotinergic v noradrenergic) produced suggestive GWAS results (19) and highly significant findings with an inflammatory marker (high sensitivity CRP) that appears to be state dependent (20). The GENDEP study, along with other GWAS related studies, has generated vast amounts of clinical and ‘omics’ data. With psychiatry now entering a big data era , McGuffin and colleagues are developing machine learning and AI related approaches as a practical solution  to big data analysis [26].

Career and role in modern psychiatric genetics
By the late 1970s psychiatric genetics had almost disappeared in the United Kingdom as an active branch of science. The MRC were sufficiently concerned that they established an earmarked clinical training fellowship in the subject to which Peter McGuffin was appointed at the Institute of Psychiatry in 1979. He established links with labs elsewhere and gained training at the Royal London and UCL before spending 18 months at Washington University in St. Louis , one of the few centres in the world where psychiatric genetics was thriving. He returned to the UK in 1982 as one of the first appointees to the new MRC Senior Clinical Fellowship scheme and established a group within the genetic section of the Institute which was now beginning a renaissance under Robin Murray.  He proposed setting up a European collaboration which was funded by the ESF as the Molecular Neurobiology of Mental Illness programme (MNMI) and played a catalytic role in rejuvenating psychiatric genetics in Europe. With Tim Crow he organised the first two World Congresses of Psychiatric Genetics which then led to the formation of the International Society of Psychiatric Genetics. He succeeded Theodore Reich, the founding president, as the first of the society’s elected presidents. In 1987, aged 37, he took up the Chair of Psychological Medicine in Cardiff in a department that had little research profile and within a few years had built a group in psychiatric genetics that was seen as world leading and was awarded an MRC Clinical Research Initiative (CRI) Centre in 1992. In 1998 he became a founding fellow of the Academy of Medical Sciences, later serving on council, and in the same year was appointed, in succession to Michael Rutter, as Director of the MRC Social, Genetic and Developmental Psychiatry (SGDP) Centre, King’s College London. The SGDP expanded under his leadership achieving a major JIF award for a new building and successfully undergoing three quinquennial Centre grant renewals as one of the foremost departments of it kind in the world. 
Contributions to research:
 1.Linkage and association
As a junior doctor Peter McGuffin carried out one of the earliest allelic association studies in psychiatry. This implicated the major histocompatibility complex (MHC) in schizophrenia. He subsequently performed a meta-analysis of his and four other studies of HLA-schizophrenia association  showing highly significant results  . The MHC association was eventually confirmed by genome wide association studies (GWAS) more than 30 years later. He went on to perform the first family linkage study of schizophrenia that used multiple classical markers and applied plausible parametric models as well as non-parametric analysis [7]. This formed the basis of his PhD in which he also performed power analyses demonstrating that very much larger sample sizes would be necessary to identify responsible loci in disorders such as schizophrenia using linkage because of incomplete penetrance . To this end McGuffin, with his colleague Roger Marchbanks, wrote a proposal to the European Science Foundation (ESF) that led to the multi centre network, then programme, on MNMI .The MNMI ran from 1987–96 and brought together 14 ESF member organisations including the MRC. It kick started molecular psychiatric genetics in Europe and inspired the setting up of a parallel multicentre collaboration in the US under NIMH.
A solution to the problem of establishing diagnostic standardisation and reliability across the European and US collaborations was provided by the computerised OPCRIT system (5). OPCRIT showed good reliability across European and US sites   and has continued to be used frequently in genetic and epidemiological studies including the bipolar disorder (BPD) component of the landmark 2007 Wellcome Trust Case Control study. 
Long before it was technically achievable, McGuffin was an advocate of aiming to scan the entire genome for genes involved in the common disorders such as schizophrenia, BPD and major depressive disorder (MDD), bearing in mind that they likely involved several, perhaps many, genes. This was also likely to be the case for quantitative behavioural traits such as cognitive ability. The principles were set out in an influential review with Plomin and Owen (6) which pointed out that linkage was appropriate for detection of quantitative trait loci (QTL) or polygenes contributing comparatively large amounts of variance (~10%) whereas association can detect small effects (1% or less). At this stage genome wide linkage was becoming feasible but GWAS was still a dream. The alternative association approach was a focus on candidate genes that encode for proteins with a plausible aetiological role. An example was the 5HT2a receptor gene found to be schizophrenia associated by EMASS (EU funded, PI McGuffin), the first multicentre candidate gene association study of its type (10).  
McGuffin subsequently led genome wide searches including the GSK funded Depression Network (DeNt) sib pair linkage study across 7 European and US sites [21] and the MRC funded first GWAS of MDD [23]. As with other disorders these initial genome wide searches pointed to the need for vastly larger sample sizes and so McGuffin’s group pooled resources with others forming the Psychiatric Genomics Consortium (PGC) which has gone onto to identify multiple genome wide significant ‘hits’ in BPD, MDD as well as in schizophrenia, autism and ADHD. By sharing genome wide data McGuffin’s group have also participated in successful searches in other disorders including MND and eye disease.
2. Gene -Environment (GE) Interplay
In 1982 McGuffin became the first psychiatrist to be awarded an MRC senior clinical fellowship. This was to carry out a novel family study of index cases with or without serious adversity in the form of threatening life events before the onset of MDD and their relatives. Contrary to the widely held clinical view at that time that depression could be divided into reactive and endogenous forms, there was no difference in the frequency of depression in relatives whether or not the index cases had an illness precipitated by adversity. Nor was there any correspondence between clinical symptom pattern and familiality.  Furthermore, the frequency of reported life events among relatives of index cases was markedly higher than that in the general population raising the issue that both adversity and depression were familial [10]. These findings were viewed as controversial at the time challenging the idea that it was possible to separate threatening events that arise “out of the blue” from those that are dependent on an individual’s behaviour. McGuffin followed up the Camberwell findings in a study in Cardiff that compared subjects with and without onset depression and their nearest age siblings. In a series of publications McGuffin and Farmer tested the alternative hypotheses that the familial overlap between depression and life events reflected either a hazard prone lifestyle or a tendency to over perceive adversity or simply a tendency for adverse events to be shared by relatives. The findings suggested that all three types of explanation played a part and the lifestyle or cognitive components were significantly influenced by personality factors (eg 14). This was in keeping with work by McGuffin and Thapar that self reported life events in adolescents have a heritable component whereas parent reported events in the same subjects do not. The genetic contribution to self reported events was subsequently confirmed by Robert Power one of McGuffin’s PhD students by estimating GWAS derived SNP-heritability .   
On a related theme, one of the most controversial areas in 21st century behavioural genetics has concerned attempts to explore GE interactions with specific brain expressed genes, much of the original work coming from other groups in the McGuffin led MRC SGDP Centre. Uher and McGuffin( 16) have scrutinized the world data for a functional polymorphism in the promoter of the serotonin transporter (5HTT) gene and concluded that there is true effect, with positive replication depending on use of hard, objective environmental measurements. This is in keeping with McGuffin’s earlier findings that more subjective reports of adversity are influenced by personality/heritable factors. 
3. Twin studies
 McGuffin and colleagues re-examined the classic Maudsley schizophrenia study of Gottesman and Shields at a time when there widespread questioning of a genetic component for schizophrenia on the basis that studies until then had used descriptive clinical diagnoses rather than modern operational criteria. It was found that, far from reducing genetic evidence, the application of explicit and reliable modern criteria indicated high heritability [8]. Subsequently the recently introduced DSM III criteria were scrutinized and found to be valid in that, when applied strictly and excluding broader phenotypes, they defined a highly heritable syndrome [9]. Further studies using an extended Maudsley twin register series estimated heritability of related psychotic syndromes using structural equation models (SEM) (10) and also showed that the genetic components of schizophrenia and BPD overlap as well as having specific components distinct to each syndrome [18]. This was thought highly controversial at the time but has now been borne out by other studies including GWAS. Turning to mood disorders it was shown with SEM that both clinically ascertained and operationally defined MDD [16] and BPD [19] are substantially heritable with both overlapping and syndrome-specific components. Again, this has now been confirmed by GWAS. 
Until the 1990s genetic data on childhood psychiatric disorders were scant.  With his then MRC fellow Anita Thapar, McGuffin launched a systematically ascertained Cardiff twin register. Among their early findings were that depressive symptomatology before adult life is influenced by genetic factors. More specifically, genetic effects were especially important in adolescence, whereas shared environmental effects account for most of the variation among children in the 8-11 age group [13], a pattern that has subsequently been replicated elsewhere. They were also among the first to establish heritability of ADHD and that severe ADHD with conduct problems is especially heritable being a more extreme form applying a multiple threshold model (11) 
4. Pharmacogenomics
 The EU funded GENDEP study is a multi-site investigation that used animal, in vitro and human studies to investigate predictors of antidepressant response. The first of its kind, the partly randomized human study of two drugs with differing modes of action (serotinergic v noradrenergic) produced suggestive GWAS results [25] and highly significant findings with an inflammatory marker (high sensitivity CRP) that appears to be state dependent [25]. The GENDEP study, along with other GWAS related studies, has generated vast amounts of clinical and ‘omics’ data. With psychiatry now entering a big data era , McGuffin and colleagues are developing machine learning and AI related approaches as a practical solution  to big data analysis [26].

Personal life
He met Anne Farmer at medical school in Leeds and they married on graduation in 1972. She subsequently also became an academic psychiatrist and they published many papers together as well as having 3 children and 5 grandchildren.

Awards
McGuffin was elected Fellow of the Royal College of Physicians of London in 1988 and Fellow of the Royal College of Psychiatrists in 1989 and became a founder Fellow of the Academy of Medical Sciences in 1998.
Other honours include Lifetime Achievement Awards from the International Society for Psychiatric Genetics (2007) and King's College London (2012) and an Honorary Fellowship from Cardiff University (2008).
He was appointed Commander of the Order of the British Empire (CBE) in the 2016 Birthday Honours for services to biomedical research and psychiatric genetics. He served as the second president of the International Society of Psychiatric Genetics (1996-2000) .

Publications
McGuffin has published more than 500 papers and is one of the 3000 or so researchers who, according to Google Scholar, has an H index of more than 100.

Behavioral Genetics in the Postgenomic Era, by Robert Plomin, John C. DeFries, Ian W. Craig, and Peter McGuffin
Behavioral Genetics by John C. DeFries, Peter McGuffin, Gerald E. McClearn, and Robert Plomin
Beyond Nature and Nurture in Psychiatry, by James MacCabe, Owen O'Daly, Robin Murray, and Peter McGuffin
Psychiatric Genetics and Genomics, by Peter McGuffin, Michael J. Owen, and Irving I. Gottesman
Measuring Psychopathology, by Anne Farmer, Peter McGuffin, and Julie Williams
The New Genetics of Mental Illness, by Peter McGuffin and Robin Murray
Schizophrenia: The Major Issues, by Paul Bebbington and Peter McGuffin
The Essentials of Psychiatry, by Robin Murray, Ken Kendler, Peter McGuffin, and Simon Wessely

References

7.    McGuffin, P., H. Festenstein and R. M. Murray (1983). "A family study of HLA antigens and other genetic markers in schizophrenia." Psychological Medicine 13: 31-43

8.    McGuffin, P., A. E. Farmer, I. I. Gottesman, R. M. Murray and A. M. Reveley (1984). "Twin concordance for operationally defined schizophrenia: Confirmation of familiality and heritability." Archives of General Psychiatry 41: 541-545.(286)

9.     Farmer, A. E., P. McGuffin and I. I. Gottesman (1987). "Twin concordance for DSM-III schizophrenia:  Scrutinising the validity of the definition." Archives of General Psychiatry 44: 634-641.(175)

10.     McGuffin, P., R. Katz and P. Bebbington (1988). "The Camberwell Collaborative Study. III. Depression and adversity in the relatives of depressed probands." British Journal of Psychiatry 152: 775-782.

11.     McGuffin, P., A. E. Farmer and I. Harvey (1991). "A polydiagnostic application of operational criteria in studies of psychotic Illness: development and reliability of the OPCRIT system." Archives of General Psychiatry 48: 764-770.

12.     Plomin, R., M. J. Owen and P. McGuffin (1994). "The genetic basis of complex human behaviours." Science 264: 1733-1739.

13.     Thapar, A. and P. McGuffin (1994). "A twin study of depressive symptoms in childhood." British Journal of Psychiatry 165,: 259-265.

14.     McGuffin, P., R. Katz, J. Rutherford and S. Watkins (1996). "A hospital based twin register of the Heritability of DSM-IV Unipolar Depression." Archives of General Psychiatry 53: 129-136.

15.     Williams, J., G. Spurlock, P. McGuffin, J. Mallet, M. M. Nothen, M. Gill, H. Aschauer, P. Nylander, F. Macciardi and M. J. Owen (1996). "Association between schizophrenia and the T102C polymorphism of the 5-hydroxytryptamine type 2a-receptor gene." The Lancet 347(May): 1294-1296.

16.  Cardno, A. G., B. Coid, A. M. MacDonald, T. R. Ribchester, N. J. Davies, P. Venturi, L. A. Jones, S. W. Lewis, P. C. Sham, I. I. Gottesman, A. E. Farmer, P. McGuffin, A. M. Reveley and R. M. Murray (1999). "Heritability estimates for psychotic disorders: The Maudsley Twin Psychosis series." Archives of General Psychiatry 56: 162-168.

17.  Thapar, A., R. Harrington and P. McGuffin (2001). "Examining the comorbidity of ADHD related behaviours and conduct problems using a twin study design." British Journal of Psychiatry 179: 224-229.

18.  Cardno, A. G., F. V. Rijsdijk, P. C. Sham, R. M. Murray and P. McGuffin (2002). "A twin study of genetic relationships between psychotic symptoms." American Journal of Psychiatry 159(4): 539-545.

19.  McGuffin, P., F. Rijsdijk, M. Andrew, P. Sham, R. Katz and A. Cardno (2003). "The heritability of bipolar affective disorder and the genetic relationship to unipolar depression." Achives of General Psychiatry 60: 497-502.

20  Farmer, A., A. Mahmood, K. Redman, T. Harris, S. Sadler and P. McGuffin (2003). "A sib-pair study of the Temperament and Character Inventory scales in major depression." Archives of General Psychiatry 60: 490-496.

21.  McGuffin, P., J. Knight, G. Breen, S. Brewster, P. Boyd, N. Craddock, M. Gill, A. Korszun, W. Maier, L. Middleton, O. Mors, M. Owen, J. Perry, M. Preisig, T. Reich, J. Rice, M. Rietschel, L. Jones, P. Sham and A. Farmer (2005). "Whole genome linkage scan of recurrent depressive disorder from the Depression Network (DeNt) Study." Human Molecular Genetics 14(22): 3337-3345.

22.  Uher, R. and P. McGuffin (2008). "The moderation by the serotonin transporter gene of environmental adversity in the aetiology of mental illness: review and methodological analysis." Molecular Psychiatry 13: 131-146.

23.  Lewis, C. M., Ng, M. Y., Butler, A. W., Cohen-Woods, S., Uher, R., Pirlo, K., Weale, M. E., Schosser, A., Paredes, U. M., Rivera, M., Craddock, N., Owen, M. J., Jones, L., Jones, I., Korszun, A., Aitchison, K. J., Shi, J., Quinn, J. P., Mackenzie, A., Vollenweider, P., W.eber, G., Heath, S., Lathrop, M., Muglia, P., Barnes, M. R., Whittaker, J. C., Tozzi, F., Holsboer, F., Preisig, M., Farmer, A. E., Breen, G., Craig, I. W., and McGuffin, P. (2010): Genome-wide association study of major recurrent depression in the U.K. population. Am J Psychiatry 167, 949-57.

24. Uher R, Perroud N, Ng MY, Hauser J, Henigsberg N, Maier W, Mors O, Placentino A, Rietschel M, Souery D, Zagar T, Czerski PM, Jerman B, Larsen ER, Schulze TG, Zobel A, Cohen-Woods S, Pirlo K, Butler AW, Muglia P, Barnes MR, Lathrop M, Farmer A, Breen G, Aitchison KJ, Craig I, Lewis CM, McGuffin P Genome-wide pharmacogenetics of antidepressant response in the GENDEP project. Am J Psychiatry. 2010 May;167(5):555-64

25. Uher R, Tansey KE, Dew T, Maier W, Mors O, Hauser J, Dernovsek MZ, Henigsberg N, Souery D, Farmer A, McGuffin P An inflammatory biomarker as a differential predictor of outcome of depression treatment with escitalopram and nortriptyline. .Am J Psychiatry. 2014 171(12):1278-86 (226 citations)

26.  Iniesta R, Stahl D, McGuffin P  Machine learning, statistical learning and the future of biological research in psychiatry.

.Psychol Med. 2016 Sep;46(12):2455-65 
 Schizophrenia Working Group of the Psychiatric Genomics Consortium.  Epub 2014 Jul 22 
 "Collaborative strategies in the molecular genetics of the major psychoses". Leboyer M, McGuffin P. Br J Psychiatry. 1991 May;158:605-10
 "No. 61608". The London Gazette (Supplement). 11 June 2016. p. B9.

20th-century British medical doctors
21st-century British medical doctors
British psychiatrists
British geneticists
Psychiatric geneticists
1949 births
Living people
Alumni of the University of London
Alumni of the University of Leeds
Alumni of the University of Wales
Washington University in St. Louis alumni
Fellows of the Academy of Medical Sciences (United Kingdom)
Academics of King's College London
Fellows of King's College London
Commanders of the Order of the British Empire